In 1909 Frank E. Wade founded Fairmont Railway Motors of Fairmont, Minnesota (renamed the Fairmont Gas Engine and Railway Motor Car Company in 1915), was a manufacturer of rail vehicles formed from the Fairmont Machine Company.  In 1928 the company acquired Mudge and Company and in 1955, the railcar interests of the Fairbanks-Morse company (which had purchased the Sheffield company in the 1920s).  Fairmont merged with Harsco Corporation in 1979 to become part of Harsco Track Technologies (Harsco Rail in 2009).  Fairmont products included:

internal combustion engines such as the PHB and QB models
maintenance of way vehicles such as speeders, small derrick cars, 
small shipping vehicles such as combination platform cars, etc.

References

External links 

 Martin County Historical Society

Defunct manufacturing companies based in Minnesota
Defunct rolling stock manufacturers of the United States
Vehicle manufacturing companies established in 1909
Vehicle manufacturing companies disestablished in 1979
1909 establishments in Minnesota
1979 disestablishments in Minnesota
Motor vehicle manufacturers based in Minnesota
American companies established in 1909
American companies disestablished in 1979